Pis is a commune in the Gers department in southwestern France.

Geography

Localisation

Hydrography 
The river Auroue forms most of the commune's eastern border.

Population

See also
Communes of the Gers department

References
citypopulation.de

Communes of Gers